The name Guillermo has been used for eight tropical cyclones in the Eastern Pacific Ocean.
 Hurricane Guillermo (1979)
 Tropical Storm Guillermo (1985)
 Hurricane Guillermo (1991)
 Hurricane Guillermo (1997)
 Tropical Storm Guillermo (2003)
 Hurricane Guillermo (2009)
 Hurricane Guillermo (2015)
 Tropical Storm Guillermo (2021)

Guillermo